Fabrizio Maracchi (Latin: Fabritius Maracchius; 1618 – August 1676) was a Roman Catholic prelate who served as Bishop of Termoli (1662–1676).

He was born in 1618 in Pontremoli, Italy.
On 13 Feb 1662, he was appointed during the papacy of Pope Alexander VII as Bishop of Termoli.
He served as Bishop of Termoli until his death in August 1676.

References

External links and additional sources
 (Chronology of Bishops) 
 (Chronology of Bishops) 

17th-century Italian Roman Catholic bishops
Bishops appointed by Pope Alexander VII
1618 births
1676 deaths